The Newton Lacy Pierce Prize in Astronomy is awarded annually by the American Astronomical Society to a young (less than age 36) astronomer for outstanding achievement in observational astronomical research. The prize is named after Newton Lacy Pierce, an American astronomer.

Pierce Prize winners
Source: AAS

 1974  Edwin M. Kellogg
 1975  Eric Becklin
 1976  James Roger Angel
 1977  Donald N.B. Hall
 1978  James M. Moran, Jr.
 1979  D. Harper
 1980  Jack Baldwin
 1981  Bruce Margon
 1982  Marc Davis
 1983  Alan Dressler
 1984  Marc Aaronson, Jeremy Mould
 1985  Richard G. Kron
 1986  Reinhard Genzel
 1987  Donald E. Winget
 1988  Sallie L. Baliunas
 1989  Harriet Dinerstein
 1990  Kristen Sellgren
 1991  Kenneth G. Libbrecht
 1992  Alexei Filippenko
 1993  Arlin P.S. Crotts
 1994  No award
 1995  Andrew McWilliam
 1996  Michael Strauss
 1997  Alyssa A. Goodman
 1998  Andrea Ghez
 1999  Dennis F. Zaritsky
 2000  Kirpal Nandra
 2001  Kenneth R. Sembach
 2002  Amy Barger
 2003  Xiaohui Fan
 2004  Niel Brandt
 2005  Andrew Blain
 2006  Bryan Gaensler
 2007  No award
 2008 Lisa Kewley
 2009 Joshua Bloom
 2010 Tommaso Treu
 2011 Gaspar Bakos
 2012 John A. Johnson
 2013 Jason Kalirai
 2014 Nadia L. Zakamska
 2015 Heather A. Knutson
 2016 Karin Öberg
 2017 Evan Kirby
 2018 Caitlin Casey
 2019 Daniel R. Weisz
 2020 Emily Levesque

See also

 List of astronomy awards

References

External links
 Newton Lacy Pierce prize, from the American Astronomical Society

Astronomy prizes
American awards
Awards established in 1974
American Astronomical Society